The Other Woman is a 1918 American silent drama film directed by Albert Parker and starring Peggy Hyland,  Milton Sills and Anna Lehr.

Cast
 Peggy Hyland as 	Eleanor Gates
 Milton Sills as 	Mr. Harrington
 Anna Lehr as 	Mrs. Harrington

References

Bibliography
 Connelly, Robert B. The Silents: Silent Feature Films, 1910-36, Volume 40, Issue 2. December Press, 1998.

External links
 

1910s American films
1918 films
1918 drama films
1910s English-language films
American silent feature films
Silent American drama films
American black-and-white films
Films directed by Albert Parker
Pathé Exchange films